Aggabai Sasubai was a 2019 Indian Marathi romance-drama television series directed by Ajay Mayekar and produced by Sunil Bhosale. The series is about Asavari Kulkarni (played by Nivedita Joshi-Saraf), a middle-aged widow and single mother whose daughter in law Shubhra (played by Tejashri Pradhan) tries to get her remarried to Abhijeet Raje (played by Girish Oak), a popular chef.

Aggabai Sasubai had a sequel titled Aggabai Sunbai which was aired from 15 March to 21 August 2021 and starred actors Adwait Dadarkar and Uma Pendharkar for the roles of Soham and Shubhra respectively. Mohan Joshi replaced actor Ravi Patwardhan from January to March 2021 after Patwardhan' death.

Plot 

Asavari Kulkarni is a middle-aged widow living with her lazy son Soham Kulkarni and strict father-in-law Dattatray Kulkarni aka Aajoba in Sahajivan Society, a middle-class apartment in Thane, Maharashtra. Her unseen husband Prabhakar had died a couple decades ago and therefore she had to raise Soham as a single mother, causing neglect to her personal ambitions. Soon, Soham's former college-mate Shubhra announces to the Kulkarnis that she and Soham wish to marry each other. Asavari agrees to this but Aajoba objects their union. After having a register marriage in the absence of Aajoba, Soham and Shubhra have lunch along with Asavari in the restaurant of Abhijeet Raje, a popular chef to acts in a cookery show.

He falls in love with Asavari and sends her a sweet dish via Shubhra. That night, Asavari informs Abhijeet over the phone that she liked his sweet dish. Meanwhile, Soham and Shubhra's friends organize a stay for the two as a marriage gift. However, Aajoba turns furious on learning about this and forcefully makes them return home. The next day, Shubhra finds deceased Prabhakar's old camera while cleaning the store room which makes Asavari emotional. Aajoba secretly uploads the photograph of the camera on the internet in order to sell it. Later, the Kulkarnis go to a temple to perform a Pooja for Soham and Shubhra's new marriage. While there, Aajoba lashes out at Abhijeet upon mistaking him for stealing his sandals but Shubhra calms him down and takes him home. Abhijeet subsequently arrives at Asavari's house in order to buy the camera sold by Aajoba. Asavari accidentally mixes rice grains in his coffee as she gets baffled due to his unexpected arrival. She then gets emotional when Abhijeet gives her a cheque in exchange of the camera. On seeing her condition, Abhijeet deliberately leaves the camera at Asavari's house for her feelings. Further, Asavari goes to Abhijeet's restaurant to return him the cheque as Aajoba agrees to keep the camera as well. That night, Abhijeet sets out to drop Asavari home and the two have tea in the rain on the streets. Meanwhile, Soham and Aajoba are forced to order food from a restaurant as Soham is unable to heat the food cooked by Asavari. On returning home, Asavari feels guilty on seeing Aajoba's plight.

After a couple of days, Shubhra orders a microwave for Soham while Asavari goes to a vegetable market where Abhijeet meets her and gifts her a pumpkin. Abhijeet slowly decides to express his feelings for Asavari and invites her to his restaurant for dinner. However, she receives a phone-call from Soham who informs her that he has fallen off his scooter, making her rush back home. Abhijeet chases her and calls her downstairs where he confesses his love for her. A shocked Asavari is disappointed as Abhijeet thought of going beyond their friendship and tells him that she does not wish to marry him. At home, Shubhra points out to a distressed Asavari that Abhijeet loves her a lot and that he will keep her happy. Later, she explains to a shell-shocked Abhijeet downstairs that Asavari does not wish to remarry because she has a good life and family members. Meanwhile, Asavari feels hurt as Soham and Aajoba berate her over abandoning an injured Soham.

The next day, Shubhra meets a distressed Abhijeet and advises him not to meet Asavari until she admits that she loves him too. Later that day, Soham meets Abhijeet in his restaurant and while secretly going to his wallet, he is shocked to discover Asavari's photograph in it. Upon returning home, an infuriated Soham destroys Abhijeet's recipes written by Asavari in a notebook. That evening, Asavari calls up a grocery shop to order groceries. However, the number accidentally gets dialed to Abhijeet as she is plagued by his memories. Further, Asavari decides to go to the grocery shop. Meanwhile, Abhijeet realises Asavari's feelings for him and reaches her house to meet her. The two end up meeting each other downstairs. While there, Abhijeet makes Asavari admit that she is in love with him too and expresses his feelings for her just as they are overheard by Soham and Shubhra. Aajoba eventually realises his folly and agrees to their marriage. Abhijeet and Asavari get married.

Cast

Main 
 Tejashri Pradhan as Shubhra Anil Kamat / Shubhra Soham Kulkarni (2019-2021)
 Nivedita Joshi-Saraf as Asavari Prabhakar Kulkarni / Asavari Abhijeet Raje (2019-2021)
 Girish Oak as Abhijeet Raje (2019-2021)
 Ashutosh Patki as Soham Prabhakar Kulkarni (2019-2021)
 Ravi Patwardhan as Dattatray Bandopant Kulkarni (2019-2020)
 Mohan Joshi replaced Ravi as Dattatray Bandopant Kulkarni (2021)

Recurring 
 Sanjeevani Sathe as Pradnya Sunil Karkhanis (2019-2021)
 Arun Mohare as Vidyadhar Karkhanis (2019-2021)
 Rajshri Potdar as Prabha Vidyadhar Karkhanis (2019-2021)
 Pratibha Goregaonkar as Sulabha Samant (2019-2021)
 Mahesh Kokate as Kamalakar Katekor (2019-2021)
 Bhakti Ratnaparkhi as Mandodari Parab (Maddy) (2019-2021)
 Bhagyesh Patil as Vishwas (2019-2021)
 Leena Athavale-Datar as Asha Anil Kamat; Shubhra's mother (2019-2020)
 Rajesh Bhosale as Mangesh (2020-2021)
 Nikhil Zope as Akshay (2019-2020)
 Sandip Patil as Abhi's Kitchen's chef (2019-2021)
 Sahil Parab as Boy Bal; Soham's servant (2020)
 Pournima Dey-Demana as Twinkle (2020)
 Sakshi Gandhi as Pritali (2020)

Sequel 
A sequel titled Aggabai Sunbai was launched on 15 March 2021. Actors Girish Oak, Mohan Joshi and Nivedita Joshi-Saraf played their respective roles of Abhijeet, Aajoba and Asavari. However, actors Ashutosh Patki and Tejashri Pradhan were replaced by actors Adwait Dadarkar and Uma Pendharkar for the roles of Soham and Shubhra. The series also starred Chinmay Udgirkar in lead role. The television series was cancelled on 21 August 2021.

Adaptations

Reception 
The series premiered on 22 July 2019, replacing Tula Pahate Re.

Special episode

2 hours 
 19 January 2020 (Asavari-Abhijeet's marriage)

1 hour 
 17 January 2021
 21 February 2021

Ratings

Awards

References

External links 
 
Aggabai Sasubai at ZEE5

Zee Marathi original programming
Marathi-language television shows
2019 Indian television series debuts
2021 Indian television series endings